The 2016 Georgia Firebirds season was the first season for the American indoor football franchise, and their first in American Indoor Football.

On November 18, 2015, the Firebirds finalized the contract with the city of Albany, Georgia, and the Albany Civic Center, to play indoor football for the 2016 season. Prior to becoming an indoor team, the organization had played in various semi-pro outdoor leagues.

On March 20, 2016, the Firebirds lost their first ever game in franchise history. The following day, Daniels was fired as the Firebirds head coach, replaced by Antwone Savage.

On May 14, 2016, the Firebirds were forced to forfeit their final game at the Savannah Steam due to transportation issues.

Schedule
Key:

Exhibition
All start times are local to home team

Regular season
All start times are local to home team

Standings

References

Georgia Firebirds
Georgia Firebirds
Georgia Firebirds